Hsieh Su-wei and Peng Shuai were the defending champions, but they chose not to participate this year.
Chuang Chia-jung and Liang Chen won the title, defeating Alizé Cornet and Magda Linette in the final, 2–6, 7–6(7–3), [10–7], despite being a match point down in the second set.

Seeds

Draw

Draw

References
Main Draw

2014 WTA Tour
2014 Doubles
2014 in Chinese tennis